{{Infobox artist
| name           = Shaun Gladwell
| image          = Shaun Gladwell Plank with Kangaroo 2014.jpg
| imagesize      = 
| caption        = Gladwell planking with a Kangaroo
| birth_date     = 
| birth_place    = Sydney, Australia
| death_date     = 
| death_place    =
| field          = Video art, sculpture, photography, painting
| training       = Sydney College of the Arts, UNSW College of Fine Arts, Goldsmiths, University of London
| movement       = Multimedia art
| works          =  Storm Sequence, 'The Turning (film)| patrons        =  Elton John
}}

Shaun Gladwell (born 1972) is an Australian contemporary artist whose work spans moving image, painting, photography, sculpture, installation, performance and virtual reality.

Early life
Gladwell was born in Sydney in 1972 and graduated from Sydney University's Sydney College of the Arts. He subsequently gained a master's degree from the University of New South Wales' College of Fine Arts and undertook further studies as an associate researcher at Goldsmiths, University of London (2001–2002) on a Samstag Scholarship from the University of South Australia. Initially, the artist studied painting but explored video and other mediums as a postgraduate student. In the late 1990s, Gladwell was a member of the Sydney-based art collective, Imperial Slacks.

Work

2000–2013

Gladwell's video work from 2000 until 2013 saw the artist attempt to systematically catalogue many of the 'movement cultures' that were emerging and evolving within his generation. In interviews, Gladwell has described his interest in forms of Street dance, extreme sport, and skateboarding.

Maddestmaximvs 2009
From 2007 until 2009 the artist applied many of his ideas concerning performance, gesture and the transformation of urban space to natural environments. During this period, Gladwell spent extended amounts of time in the Australian desert, producing his iconic series of works titled Maddestmaximus (2009). The series included video of Gladwell car surfing (Interceptor Surf Sequence) and ritualistically burying roadkill kangaroos (Apologies 1–6).

Official Australian war artist 2009–2010
In late 2009, Gladwell was the Australian War Memorial's Australian official war artists in Afghanistan. This commissioning program began in World War I with Gladwell being the first video/new media artist in the history of the scheme. Gladwell has stated that during this commission he became both reliant upon and extremely critical of military technology within the theatre of war. A key work Gladwell made during his time in Southern Afghanistan is titled Double Field/Viewfinder (Tarin Kowt), 2009–2010.

The artist's work from this commission has been documented and analysed in the book Double War by Kit Messham-Muir, published by Thames and Hudson, 2015.

Skateboarders VS Minimalism 2016
In January 2016, Gladwell presented a new video work titled Skateboarders VS Minimalism. The project was commissioned for the 40th Anniversary of the Sydney Festival and illustrates the artist's interest in juxtaposing popular sports culture with art history and museum culture. The video features skateboarders (including professional Rodney Mullen) riding on exact replicas of well known minimalist artworks. The soundtrack for this video features the music of
Philip Glass.

Shaun Gladwell: Pacific Undertow
In mid to late 2019, Gladwell exhibited at the Museum of Contemporary Art, Sydney with Pacific Undertow. Pacific Undertow was the largest survey exhibition to date of the work of Australian artist Shaun Gladwell, best known for his videos representing the body in motion. The exhibition title, Pacific Undertow, is taken from a pivotal video piece. It resonates with a sense of elemental forces, motion and the heft of gravity: key principles that inform Gladwell's work.

 Virtual reality 
In 2016, Gladwell co-founded BADFAITH, an independent virtual reality content collective with senior film and television producer Leo Faber. Members of BADFAITH include artists, film directors, and a scientist involved in VR and AR research. They have been dubbed VR pioneers by Vogue and Vice – who described their approach to the new immersive medium as "punk".

In interviews, Gladwell stated BADFAITH as a direct reference to the concept proposed by Jean Paul Sartre and Simone de Belvouire. Gladwell has produced several VR experiences through the BADFAITH network including the 6 minute animation Orbital Vanitas. Orbital Vanitas premiered at Sundance's 2017 New Frontiers.

In 2017, Orbital Vanitas was also shown at Cannes film festival and the Sydney Film festival amongst others. Orbital Vanitas was also selected for distribution via the New York Times op docs VR distribution platform NYTVR. Under the BADFAITH moniker, Gladwell and Faber co-curated the 2017 Sydney Film Festivals VR program. In 2016 Gladwell was the first documented artist to sell a virtual reality artwork on the Australian market.

Opera
Gladwell was commissioned by the 2013 Gergiev Festival to produce video art for a concert version of Richard Wagner's The Flying Dutchman. The opera was performed by the Rotterdam Philharmonic Orchestra, conducted by Yannick Nézet-Séguin on Sunday 15 September 2013 at De Doelen, Rotterdam. Gladwell interpreted Richard Wagner's opera as an Australian surf film by replacing all sailing references in the libretto with ones involving surfing. Regarding this work, Gladwell has stated that he was inspired by the seminal Australian surf film Morning of the Earth (1971). The video used a cast of performers that were both professional dancers and surfers.

 Performance and choreography 
Gladwell has presented several live performances and choreographies since 2011. Gladwell's performance piece Reversed Readymade (2014) features a professional BMX bicycle rider performing stunts on Marcel Duchamp's Bicycle Wheel (1913). The work premiered at the inaugural Per4m program at Artissima 21, Turin, Italy, in November 2014. Initially, the piece was performed by professional Welsh BMX rider, Matti Hemmings, however subsequent performances in Australia have been enacted by Simon O'Brien.

Film
In 2012, Gladwell directed a chapter titled "Family" for the feature film The Turning (2013). The anthology film is based on a collection of short stories by Australian author, Tim Winton. Gladwell cast Meyne Wyatt and Wayne Blair into the roles of two brothers in dispute. The Turning premiered at the Melbourne International Film Festival on 3 August 2013.

Writing
In 2015, Gladwell published an artist book titled PATAFUNCTIONS in association with his solo exhibition titled The Lacrima Chair at the Sherman Contemporary Art Foundation. Gladwell describes the book as "fictional theory" and "simulated theory." The text features contributions from Denise Thwaites, Paul Patton and Kit Messham-Muir. PATAFUNCTIONS offers an exegesis on Gladwell's art practice and his wider thinking on issues of function and transformation. The cover design for PATAFUNCTIONS is an exact graphic appropriation of the Semiotext(e) Foreign Agents Series design by Jim Fleming from the 1980s.

Criticism
Gladwell's entire artistic career has been questioned by a number of critics, particularly within Australia. Negative criticism was surveyed in a 2015 feature article in The Australian newspaper by Ashleigh Wilson:

The art critic most vocally against Gladwell's work is John McDonald who identifies the work as 'hype'. In doing so, McDonald calls into question the Australian art institutions that support Gladwell:

Exhibitions
Gladwell has been exhibiting extensively throughout Australia, Asia, the United States and Europe since 2001. He has participated in many international biennales and triennales, including: the Yokohama Triennale (2005); Busan Biennale and Bienal de São Paulo (both 2006); La Biennale di Venezia (2007 & 2009); the Biennale of Sydney, Taipei Biennial and Biennale Cuvée, Linz (all 2008); Cairo Biennial (2010); the Shanghai Biennale, China (2012); The California-Pacific Triennial and SCAPE 7, Public Art Christchurch Biennial, New Zealand (both 2013); as well as la Biennale d’Arte Contemporain, Douai (2015). In 2009, Gladwell was Australia's representative at the 53rd Venice Biennale.

Elton John
Gladwell's photographs, lightboxes and videos have been collected by Elton John, particularly work relating to human interaction with other species and the natural world.

Skateboarding
Whilst skateboarding frequently features in Gladwell's artworks, he himself competed in freestyle skateboarding competitions throughout the late 1980s. He occasionally competes in freestyle skateboarding events such as the 2011 Malmo Super Bowl in Sweden and the 2012 World Roundup in Cloverdale Canada. For the 2013 SCAPE 7 public art triennale in Christchurch, New Zealand, Gladwell designed skate-able sculptures that reflected the fractured urban landscape post 2011 Christchurch earthquake.
For the 2016 Perth International Arts Festival, Gladwell was in a public conversation with legendary freestyle skateboarder Russ Howell.

Environmentalism
The artist has described himself as "environmentally concerned", presenting his ideas on art and the environment at ARTCOP 21 in Paris (2015), having been a finalist in the COAL Prize for Art and Environment that same year.

Gladwell lives and works in Sydney and London.

Literature
 Shaun Gladwell: The Lacrima Chair (2015). Published by the Sherman Contemporary Art Foundation. 
 Double War: Shaun Gladwell, Visual Culture and the Wars in Afghanistan and Iraq Kit Messham-Muir (2015). Published by Thames & Hudson 
 Patafunctions (2015). Published by the Sherman Contemporary Art Foundation. 
 Cycles of Radical Will (2013) Essay by Richard Grayson. Published by the De La Warr Pavilion, U.K. 
 Point of View: Afghanistan (2013) Published by the Australian War Memorial 
 Perpetual 360 Degree Sessions (2011) Published by Schunck, The Netherlands. 
 Shaun Gladwell MATRIX 162 (2011) Published by the Wadsworth Atheneum of Art, Hartford, Connecticut.
 Stereo Sequences (2011), Published by Schwartz City & The Australian Centre for the Moving Image. 
 Interceptor Intersection (2010) Published by Schwartz City and Cambelltown Art Center. 
 Maddestmaximus: Planet and Stars Sequence (2009) Published by Schwartz City/ Australia Council for the Arts. 
 Shaun Gladwell Videoworks (2008) Published by Artspace, Sydney. 
 Practices of the City and the Kickflipping Flaneur'' (2000) Kit Messham-Muir. Published by Artspace, Sydney.

References

1972 births
Living people
Australian war artists
20th-century war artists
Australian contemporary artists
Australian skateboarders
Archibald Prize finalists